Novaya Bura (Yañı Bura; , Pura Jal) is a rural locality (a selo) and the administrative centre of Novoburinsky Selsoviet, Krasnokamsky District, Bashkortostan, Russia. The population was 593 as of 2010. There are 7 streets.

Geography 
Novaya Bura is located 56 km southeast of Nikolo-Beryozovka (the district's administrative centre) by road. Staraya Bura and Kiremetevo are the nearest rural localities.

References 

Rural localities in Krasnokamsky District